Jennifer Lesley Ellison (born 30 May 1983) is an English actress, former glamour model, television personality, dancer and singer. Ellison is perhaps best known for playing Emily Shadwick in the television soap opera Brookside until 2003, and as Meg Giry in the 2004 film adaptation of The Phantom of the Opera. Ellison also starred on the reality television show Dance Mums with Jennifer Ellison, the UK version of the American show Dance Moms.

Career

Dance
Ellison studied dance from the age of three, first at a dance school in Liverpool, then later at the Elizabeth Hill School of Dancing in St Helens. She has achieved examination passes with the Royal Academy of Dance and appeared on instructional videos for the academy. She has also taken examinations with the International Dance Teachers Association (IDTA) and won Ballet and Modern Dance titles at the IDTA Theatre Dance Championships in 1996 and 1997, and in addition was awarded the Carl Alan Award for ballet in 1998. Choosing to pursue a professional career in dance, she successfully auditioned for the Royal Ballet Lower School. She left dance to pursue acting.

In 2012, Ellison was a contestant on Dancing on Ice and made it to the semi-final stages. She hosted the UK version of Dance Moms on Lifetime, Dance Mums with Jennifer Ellison in 2014–15.

Television
From 1998 to 2003, Ellison played Emily Shadwick in the soap opera Brookside. Her character was 'killed off' when she fell from a window during a robbery. In 2003, Ellison appeared in the travel documentary Jennifer Ellison does Thailand and in 2004, she appeared on the reality television show Hell's Kitchen, which she then went on to win. In 2005, she appeared on the celebrity challenge show With a Little Help From My Friends.

In spring 2007, Ellison appeared in the BBC reality TV show The Verdict, based on a fictional courtroom, alongside the likes of Jeffrey Archer and Sara Payne. That same year, she appeared as a judge on Dirty Dancing – Time of your Life a United States-based reality television show for the Living TV network. By December of that year, Ellison began appearing as a guest panellist on the ITV daytime show Loose Women.

Additionally, Ellison has also acted in episodes of the British television series The Brief, Hotel Babylon, New Street Law and The Commander. In September 2008, she appeared in a 2-hour long show, called Ghosthunting with Paul O'Grady & Friends, filmed in Sicily, with fellow Liverpudlians Paul O'Grady, Philip Olivier and Natasha Hamilton.

Music
After success in television and men's magazines, Ellison pursued a pop music career. She released two pop rock singles before giving this venture up for acting and glamour modelling. Her first single was "Baby I Don't Care", released in June 2003, which reached No. 6 in the UK Singles Chart. The song was originally released by Transvision Vamp in 1989. The following year in July, after being brought back into the public eye after winning Hell's Kitchen, Ellison released her second single, "Bye Bye Boy" – originally recorded by the Japanese singer Nanase Aikawa – which reached No. 13 in the UK chart.

Single discography

Theatre
In 2004, Ellison had a run in the London West End theatre version of the musical Chicago at the Adelphi Theatre playing the leading role of Roxie Hart and reprised the role from 10 July to 9 August 2006, this time at the Cambridge Theatre. Ellison was actually supposed to finish on 12 August, but was forced to pull out three days early due to a knee injury. Ellison subsequently toured Britain in Chicago from 25 September 2006 until 5 May 2007. On 1 October 2007, Ellison joined the cast of a revival of Boeing Boeing at the Comedy Theatre, London, playing the part of Gloria, an American air stewardess working for the airline TWA.

On 5 December 2007, she featured in a 10th Anniversary Gala performance of Chicago at the Cambridge Theatre alongside a galaxy of stars and on 16 December 2007, she played "Angel" in Liverpool Nativity, a contemporary retelling of the Christmas story for BBC Three which was performed live from the streets of the city.

Ellison featured in the Liverpool Empire Theatre's pantomime version of Cinderella for 2008, opposite Cilla Black and Les Dennis.

She also played Beth in Jeff Wayne's Musical Version of The War of the Worlds at major arenas of the UK in June 2009.

Ellison appeared in the July – October 2010 UK tour of the stage adaption of the film Calendar Girls. The same year she appeared at the Regent Theatre, Stoke-on-Trent, in its pantomime Robinson Crusoe. As well as these, she was on the UK tour company of Legally Blonde The Musical, playing the role of 'Paulette'.

In 2012 Ellison appeared in Peter Pan at the Churchill Theatre Bromley alongside Gemma Hunt, Ace Bhatti and Andrew Agnew. From 18 February 2013 she joined Singin’ in the Rain at the Palace Theatre, London.  Ellison joined the cast to play silent movie screen siren and owner of a voice never meant for the ‘talkies’, Lina Lamont.

Ellison was cast in the pantomime of Snow White and the Seven Dwarfs, at the Theatre Royal, Norwich throughout December 2015 to January 2016.

Film
Ellison made her international film debut as Meg Giry in the 2004 film version of the stage musical The Phantom of the Opera, although her lines were dubbed over. She also starred in the English horror film The Cottage, which was released in the UK on 14 March 2008.

Modelling and magazine appearances
Ellison was featured in Maxim magazine's  "Girls of Maxim" gallery. Her photos appeared regularly in British "lads' mags" including Nuts, Zoo Weekly and FHM. Ellison took over, from Jordan, a contract with lingerie giant Ultimo for its "Young Attitude" line. Though Ultimo boss Michelle Mone had chosen Jordan for being "sexy, fun and outgoing," she later changed her mind, stating, "Jordan was just the wrong choice for [us]. Jennifer is a far better option and far classier." In 2005, Ellison was voted world's sexiest blonde by readers of the UK magazine Nuts, beating model Victoria Silvstedt, who came second, and pop superstar Britney Spears. Ellison was also a regular in the yearly FHM "100 Sexiest Women in the World" feature.

Other ventures

In 2006, Ellison released Jennifer Ellison's West End Workout, a fitness DVD which combined her love of dance with exercise routines.. In December 2011, she then released a second fitness DVD Jennifer Ellison's Fat Blaster Workout.

She is a winner of the Carl Alan Award in the ballet category for 1998, an industry award voted for by dance professionals.

She took part in the 2012 TV series Dancing on Ice. Ellison and professional partner Daniel Whiston ended up in fourth place after being voted out in the semi-final.

In May 2013 it was announced that Jennifer Ellison would join Liverpool's Radio City 96.7 to co-present a new Sunday morning Breakfast show alongside Drivetime Presenter Dave Kelly, for an initial five-week period until she was due to give birth.

Personal life
Ellison attended Broughton Hall High School, a Catholic school for girls. She then attended St Edward's College for Sixth Form. She has two younger half-sisters. Her parents, Kevin May and Jane, separated in 1986. Her mother remarried. She is close to her mother and stepfather David.

Ellison and boxer Robbie Tickle began dating in May 2008, and were engaged in October of that year while on holiday in the Maldives. The following year they were married, with the ceremony being performed in Mauritius on 10 October 2009.

Ellison has three children. On 4 February 2010 she gave birth to her first son. Her second pregnancy came to her as a surprise. Ellison said: "I didn't even know I was pregnant until four weeks ago, and I'm almost five months gone now. I can't believe I'm having another baby in July. It's been a massive shock." On 9 July 2013 she gave birth to her second son. On 26 September 2014, she gave birth to her third son.

In May 2018 Ellison was paid an undisclosed sum by Mirror Group Newspapers as settlement for phone-hacking.

References

External links

Jennifer Ellison Photoshoots

1983 births
Living people
Actresses from Liverpool
People educated at the Royal Ballet School
English child actresses
English female models
English film actresses
English musical theatre actresses
English television actresses
Glamour models
Reality cooking competition winners
People educated at St Edward's College
English women pop singers